Klisurica may refer to the following places in Serbia:

 Klisurica (Prokuplje)
 Klisurica (Vranje)